State Road 113 (SR 113), also known as Southside Connector, is a  state highway. The freeway travels almost due north–south entirely within the neighborhood of Jacksonville known as Arlington. This is completely within the city limits of Jacksonville, in Duval County, in the U.S. state of Florida. As its name implies, it "connects" SR 115 with Interstate 295 (I-295).

Route description

SR 113 begins at an interchange with SR 115 (Southside Boulevard / Arlington Expressway) just north of SR 10 (Atlantic Boulevard). It heads northeast and travels along the west edge of Regency Square Mall. It then has service roads on both sides that are one-way with traffic traveling the same direction as the main highway (i.e., the northbound one is on the eastern side, and the southbound one is on the western side). Northbound, it has an interchange with Regency Square Boulevard North and then curves to the north to an interchange with Tredinick Parkway. On the southbound side, these two exits are combined. At Tredinick Parkway, there is a Texas U-turn that allows traffic from the southbound service road to make a U-turn to access the northbound one without accessing Tredinick Parkway itself. After that, there is an interchange with the western terminus of SR 116 (Merrill Road), which leads to an interchange with Interstate 295 (I-295; Jacksonville East Beltway) south. Almost immediately afterward, the freeway curves to the northwest and feeds into I-295 north.

Exit list

See also

References

External links

113
113
113